The Alderney class was a class of three sloops of wooden construction built for the Royal Navy between 1755 and 1757. All three were built by contract with commercial builders to a common design prepared by William Bately, the Surveyor of the Navy.

The first two – Stork and Alderney – were ordered on 14 November 1755, and another vessel to the same design – Diligence – were ordered three months later, on 23 February 1756. All were begun as two-masted (snow-rigged) vessels, and the trio were all assigned names on 25 May 1756, but the first two were actually completed as three-masted ("ship-rigged") vessels.

Vessels

References 

McLaughlan, Ian. The Sloop of War 1650–1763. Seaforth Publishing, 2014. .
Winfield, Rif. British Warships in the Age of Sail 1714–1792: Design, Construction, Careers and Fates. Seaforth Publishing, 2007. .

Sloop classes